Catharine Bailey Baker (born May 1, 1971) is an American attorney and politician from California. Baker was a Republican member of the California State Assembly from 2014 to 2018. She has served on the California Fair Political Practices Commission (the state's ethics commission) since 2021.

Early life and education 
Baker was born as Catharine Ann Bailey in Cathedral City, California.

In 1993, Baker earned a Bachelor of Arts degree in Political Science from the University of Chicago. In 2000, Baker earned a JD degree in Law from UC Berkeley School of Law.

Legal career 
In 2000, Baker started her legal career as a law clerk for the Honorable Alicemarie Huber Stotler, a judge for the United States District Court for the Central District of California.

In 2001, Baker practiced law as an attorney at Morrison & Foerster LLP until 2011. In 2011, Baker practiced law as an attorney at Hoge Fenton Jones & Appel.

California State Assembly 
On November 4, 2014, Baker won the election and became a Republican member of California State Assembly for District 16, which encompasses Lamorinda and the Tri-Valley region of the San Francisco Bay Area. Baker defeated Dublin City Councilman Tim Sbranti with 51.6% of the votes. On November 8, 2016, as an incumbent, Baker won the election and continued serving District 16. Baker defeated Pleasanton City Councilwoman Cheryl Cook-Kallio with 55.9% of the vote.

On November 6, 2018, as an incumbent,  Baker sought a third term but narrowly lost the election with 49% of the votes. Baker was defeated by attorney Rebecca Bauer-Kahan.

During her time in office, Baker was the only Republican to represent any portion of the Bay Area at either the federal or the state level. A piece of legislation she authored was AB 434: State Web accessibility which came in effect on July 1, 2019.

Electoral history

2014 California State Assembly

2016 California State Assembly

2018 California State Assembly

Awards 
 2017 NFWL Elected Women of Excellence award. Presented by National Foundation for Women Legislators (November 14, 2017).
 2017 California School Boards Association (CSBA) Legislator of the Year.
 2017 We The People Award. Presented by California Common Cause.
 California Distinguished Advocacy Award. Presented by American Cancer Society Cancer Action Network.
 Crime Victims United Legislator of the Year.
 March of Dimes Legislative Champion Award.

Post-Assembly career 
After leaving the California State Assembly, Baker has returned to private practice as an attorney, and is currently Special Counsel at Hoge Fenton Jones & Appel, advising businesses and non-profit organizations.

In August 2019, Baker joined the board of Livermore Lab Foundation, a nonprofit organization, and was named the President of Diablo Regional Arts Association.

In December 2020, State Controller Betty Yee appointed Baker to a seat on the five-member California Fair Political Practices Commission for a four-year term beginning in January 2021.

Personal life 
Baker's husband is Dan Baker. They have two children. Baker and her family live in Dublin, California.

References

External links 
 Campaign website
 Catharine Baker at ballotpedia.org
 Catharine Baker at legislature.ca.gov
 Catharine Baker on AB249 at yesfairelections.org
 Catharine Baker at votersedge.org

1971 births
Living people
California lawyers
Republican Party members of the California State Assembly
Women state legislators in California
UC Berkeley School of Law alumni
University of Chicago alumni
People from Dublin, California
People from Cathedral City, California
21st-century American politicians
21st-century American women politicians